Constance Gay (born February 20, 1992) is a French actress best known for playing a lead role in the Unit 42 series. She also participated in the series Spiral.

Personal life 
Born in the Paris region on February 20, 1992, she studied at La Bruyère and Blanche de Castille high schools. She joined a business school to finally devote herself to journalism in print and radio.

Career 
Gay's first role on camera was during the first episode of the French police procedural, Spiral. Her first starring role was as Billie Veber, a young hacker who joins the cybercrime team on Unit 42, broadcast on RTBF and France 2.

She performs at the theater regularly.

Filmography

Short film
Demi-Sang - Dublin Films - Réal : Laetitia Mikles & Pierre Primetens
Qu'est ce qu'on attend? - Réal : A+W Bureau BADASS
Loop 
Retcon (prix de la meilleure actrice du 48H Film Festival)
 Summer Wine in Time (2015)

Theater
 2014 La chair des sentiments
 2014 Festin (Company Les Epis Noirs)
 2016 Rien ne pouvait nous arriver Directed by Sébastien Pouderoux of the Comédie Française
 2016 Le petit théâtre de Treplev   Directed by Jean-Pierre Garnier
 2018 J'avais un pays autrefois   Directed by Jean-Christophe Blondel at the Théâtre de l'Etoile du Nord

References

External links 
 

1992 births
Living people
French television actresses
French film actresses
French stage actresses